Hossein Abdi (born March 21, 1967) is an Iranian footballer and currently the manager of the Iran national under-17 team.

Football records 
Coach of Tehran's Persepolis football team
The head coach of Damash Gilan football team
Player of Persepolis football team in Tehran
Foulad football team player
Al Jahr football team player in Kuwait

References

External links

1967 births
Living people
Sportspeople from Tehran
Iranian footballers
Persepolis F.C. players
Persepolis F.C. non-playing staff
Damash Gilan managers
Association football midfielders
Azadegan League players
Iranian football managers